Vohra is an Indian (Punjab) Hindu and Sikh surname based on the name of a clan in the Punjabi Khatri community. Notable people with the surname include:
 Arshad Vohra (born 1958), Pakistani politician
 Bhagwati Charan Vohra (1903–1930), Indian revolutionary
 Deepak Vohra, Indian diplomat
 Manan Vohra (born 1993), Indian cricketer
 Narinder Nath Vohra (born 1936), governor of the Indian state of Jammu and Kashmir
 Rishi Vohra, Indian author
 Sunny Leone (born 1981 as Karenjit Kaur Vohra), Canadian-born Indian-American actress, businesswoman and model

See also 
 Vora (disambiguation) 
 Sunni Vohra

Indian surnames
Surnames of Indian origin
Punjabi-language surnames
Hindu surnames
Khatri clans
Khatri surnames